Joseph Couturier de Fournoue ( — 29 June 1801) was a French Navy officer. He served in the War of American Independence, earning a membership in the Society of Cincinnati and the knighthood in the Order of Saint Louis.

Biography 
Fournoue joined the Navy as a Garde-Marine on 25 February 1758. In 1759, he served in the frigate Aréthuse, and lost an arm. He was promoted to Lieutenant on 24 March 1772.

He was first officer on the 64-gun Vengeur, under Retz, and took part in the Battle of Rhode Island on 29 August 1778, the Battle of Grenada on 6 July 1779, and the Siege of Savannah in September and October 1779. He captained Vengeur in the Battle of Martinique on 18 December 1779.

Promoted to Captain on 4 April 1780, he was then given command of Vengeur. 

In June 1782, Fournoue captained the 64-gun Lion in the fleet under Córdova, taking part in the Battle of Cape Spartel.

On 28 October 1786, he married Jeanne-Marie de Montalembert. 

In 1791, Fournoue was Chef de Division in the Indian station, with his flag on the 40-gun frigate Nymphe.

Sources and references 
 Notes

Citations

Bibliography
 
 
 

External links
 

French Navy officers
French military personnel of the American Revolutionary War